Tempting Fate is a 1998 science fiction television film starring Tate Donovan and directed by Peter Werner.

Plot
A Los Angeles scientist discovers a parallel Earth where everything is peaceful  and Elvis Presley is still alive.

Cast
Tate Donovan as Dr. Ben Creed
Abraham Benrubi as John Bollandine
Matt Craven as Emmett Lach
Philip Baker Hall as Dr. Bardwell
Ming-Na Wen as Ellen Moretti

References

External links
 

1998 television films
1998 films
American science fiction television films
Films set in Los Angeles
ABC Motion Pictures films
Films about parallel universes
Films directed by Peter Werner